Zelleria sphenota is a species of moth in the family Yponomeutidae. This species is endemic to New Zealand. It is classified as "At Risk, Declining'" by the Department of Conservation.

Taxonomy
This species was first described by Edward Meyrick in 1889 and named Hofmannia sphenota. Meyrick used a specimen he collected from Riccarton Bush in August. George Hudson discussed the species in his 1928 book The Butterflies and Moths of New Zealand using the name Zelleria sphenota. The holotype specimen of this species is held at the Natural History Museum, London. The genus level classification of this moth is currently regarded as unsatisfactory. As such the species is also known as Zelleria (s.l.) sphenota.

Description
The larvae of this species are green in colour.

Meyrick described the male adult of the species as follows:

Distribution
This species is endemic to New Zealand. This species has occurred in Taupo, Nelson, Marlborough Sounds, Mid Canterbury and Southland. However it is likely extinct in the North Island.

Behaviour and life cycle
Initially the larvae of this species are leaf miners but as they mature they mine the stems of their host plants, finally moving on to consuming the leaves and flowers. They prepare for pupation by forming a white silk cocoon that is normally attached to the stem of their host plant. This stage can last as little as ten days. Adults emerge between the months of August and February.

Host plants

The host plants of this species are native leafy mistletoe. These include the species Ileostylus micranthus, Peraxilla colensoi and P. tetrapetala.

Conservation status
This moth is classified under the New Zealand Threat Classification system as being "At Risk, Declining". This is as a result of the decline of its host species brought about through the browsing of possums.

References

Moths described in 1889
Moths of New Zealand
Yponomeutidae
Endemic fauna of New Zealand
Endangered biota of New Zealand
Taxa named by Edward Meyrick
Endemic moths of New Zealand